Janusz Góra (born 8 July 1963) is a Polish retired professional footballer who played for Górnik Wałbrzych, Śląsk Wrocław, Stuttgarter Kickers, SSV Ulm 1846 and FC Augsburg. He currently manages the Śląsk Wrocław U19 team. He also represented the Poland national football team 11 times between 1989 and 1992.

Góra is well known for his emotional outburst following a 2–1 defeat against Hansa Rostock, a match in which four Ulm players were sent off.

He was the interim coach of the Polish Ekstraklasa club Lech Poznań, fulfilling his duties once in a prestigious league game against Legia Warsaw, on 11 April 2021.

On 9 March 2022, he joined Piotr Tworek's staff at Śląsk Wrocław as an assistant coach.

References

External links

1963 births
Living people
People from Bielawa
Sportspeople from Lower Silesian Voivodeship
Polish footballers
Association football defenders
Poland international footballers
Górnik Wałbrzych players
Śląsk Wrocław players
Stuttgarter Kickers players
FC Augsburg players
SSV Ulm 1846 players
Bundesliga players
2. Bundesliga players
Polish expatriate footballers
Expatriate footballers in Germany
Polish expatriate sportspeople in Germany
Polish football managers
Ekstraklasa managers
SSV Ulm 1846 managers
FC Liefering managers
Lech Poznań managers
Polish expatriate football managers
Expatriate football managers in Austria
Polish expatriate sportspeople in Austria